Presbyterian Church of McGraw is a historic Presbyterian church located at McGraw in Cortland County, New York.  It was built in 1901 to designs by architects Pierce & Bickford and is a one-story structure, irregular in plan and massing, built of "Canandaigua gold brick".  It features a tower that is square in plan at the base, but above the roofline rises in two octagonal stages built of wood with round arched louvered belfry openings and elliptical windows.  It is topped by an octagonal spire crowned by a cast metal finial.  The interior features an octagonally shaped auditorium and Palladian windows.

It was listed on the National Register of Historic Places in 2002.

References

Churches on the National Register of Historic Places in New York (state)
Presbyterian churches in New York (state)
Queen Anne architecture in New York (state)
Churches completed in 1901
20th-century Presbyterian church buildings in the United States
Churches in Cortland County, New York
National Register of Historic Places in Cortland County, New York